The Jamaican passport is issued to citizens of Jamaica for international travel. The passport is a Caricom passport as Jamaica is a member of the Caribbean Community.

As of March 2019, Jamaican citizens had visa-free or visa on arrival access to 93 countries and territories, ranking the Jamaican passport 59th in terms of travel freedom (tied with Papua New Guinea passport) according to the Henley visa restrictions index.

Passport statement
Jamaican passports contain on their inside cover the following words in English only:

Physical appearance
Passports issued after September 2001 are machine-readable passports and thus carry a machine-readable zone starting with P<JAM. On the holder's page, the following information is recorded:
Last Name
First names
Nationality (Jamaican)
Date of issue/expiry
Date and place of birth

See also
 List of passports
 Visa requirements for Jamaican citizens

References

Jamaica
Government of Jamaica